is a Japanese footballer currently playing as a centre back for Hokkaido Consadole Sapporo.

Club career
Tanaka was born in Osaka Prefecture on May 26, 1997. In May 2019, when he was an Osaka University of Health and Sport Sciences student, J1 League club Hokkaido Consadole Sapporo announced that signed a contract with Tanaka from the 2020 season.

National team career
In December 2019, when Tanaka was an Osaka University of Health and Sport Sciences student, he was selected Japan national team for 2019 EAFF E-1 Football Championship. At this tournament, he debuted as center back against Hong Kong on December 14.

Career statistics

Club
.

Notes

National team

References

External links

1997 births
Living people
Association football people from Osaka Prefecture
Japanese footballers
Japan youth international footballers
Japan international footballers
Association football defenders
J1 League players
Hokkaido Consadole Sapporo players